The Rural Municipality of Moose Jaw No. 161 is a rural municipality (RM) in the Canadian province of Saskatchewan within Census Division No. 7 and  Division No. 2. It is located in the south-central portion of the province, surrounding the City of Moose Jaw.

History 
The RM of Moose Jaw No. 161 incorporated as a rural municipality on December 11, 1911.

Geography

Communities and localities 
The following urban municipalities are surrounded by the RM.

Cities
 Moose Jaw

Villages
 Tuxford

The following unincorporated communities are within the RM.

Localities
 Boharm
 Bushell Park

Demographics 

Government 
The RM of Moose Jaw No. 161 is governed by an elected municipal council and an appointed administrator that meets on the second Tuesday of every month. The reeve of the RM is Ron Brumwell while its administrator is Mike Wirges. The RM's office is located in Moose Jaw.

References

External links 

M
 
Moose Jaw